Abieta-7,13-dien-18-ol hydroxylase (CYP720B1, PTAO) is an enzyme with systematic name abieta-7,13-dien-18-ol,NADPH:oxygen oxidoreductase (18-hydroxylating). This enzyme catalyses the following chemical reaction

 abieta-7,13-dien-18-ol + NADPH + H+ + O2  abieta-7,13-dien-18-al + NADP+ + 2 H2O (overall reaction)
(1a) abieta-7,13-dien-18-ol + NADPH + H+ + O2  abieta-7,13-dien-18,18-diol + + NADP+ + H2O:
(1b) abieta-7,13-dien-18,18-diol  abieta-7,13-dien-18-al + H2O (spontaneous)

Abietadienol hydroxylase is a heme-thiolate protein (P-450).

References

External links 
 

EC 1.14.13